Henricus Petrus Augustinus Johannes "Henri" Smulders (9 August 1863 – 8 November 1933) was a Dutch sailor who competed in the 1900 Summer Olympics in Paris, France. With crew Chris Hooykaas and Arie van der Velden Smulders took the silver in the 1st race and the 4th place in the second race of the 3 to 10 ton.

References

External links

 

1863 births
1933 deaths
Dutch male sailors (sport)
Sportspeople from 's-Hertogenbosch
Sailors at the 1900 Summer Olympics – 3 to 10 ton
Olympic sailors of the Netherlands
Olympic silver medalists for the Netherlands
Olympic medalists in sailing
Sailors at the 1900 Summer Olympics – Open class